Vexitomina coriorudis is a species of sea snail, a marine gastropod mollusk in the family Horaiclavidae.

Description
The length of the shell attains 23 mm.

(Original description) The lanceolate shell has a,subturreted shape. The spire is slender and tall. It contains 10 whorls, of which two constitute the protoconch. The suture is deeply impressed. The colour of the shell is olive-buff, with irregular tawny dashes. The epidermis is thin and fibrous. The sculpture of the earlier whorls show a double row of prominent peripheral beads, arranged about ten to a whorl. By interposition of additional spirals each double bead extends into a short oblique nodose rib. Below the suture is an indefinite band, followed by a distinct and excavate fasciole. The latter is sculptured with fine lunate striae. On the body whorl anterior to the fasciole are about twenty-three prominent but irregular spiral cords, some of which are rendered nodulous by passing over the ribs.  The outer lip is sharp and simple. The sinus is wide and V-shaped. The columella is coated with a thin callus.

Distribution
This marine species is endemic to Australia and occurs off Queensland to New South Wales

References

 Laseron, C. 1954. Revision of the New South Wales Turridae (Mollusca). Australian Zoological Handbook. Sydney : Royal Zoological Society of New South Wales 1-56, pls 1-12. 
 Powell, A.W.B. 1969. The family Turridae in the Indo-Pacific. Part. 2. The subfamily Turriculinae. Indo-Pacific Mollusca 2(10): 207–415, pls 188-324 
 Wilson, B. 1994. Australian Marine Shells. Prosobranch Gastropods. Kallaroo, WA : Odyssey Publishing Vol. 2 370 pp.
 Liu J.Y. [Ruiyu] (ed.). (2008). Checklist of marine biota of China seas. China Science Press. 1267 pp.

External links
  Tucker, J.K. 2004 Catalog of recent and fossil turrids (Mollusca: Gastropoda). Zootaxa 682:1-1295.
 

coriorudis
Gastropods described in 1922
Gastropods of Australia